The Men's pentathlon 4 was one of the events held in Athletics at the 1972 Summer Paralympics in Heidelberg.

There were 14 competitors in the event.

Eugene Reimer of Canada won the gold medal.

Results

Final

References 

Pentathlon